Aäron "Arie" Pais (16 April 1930 – 25 June 2022) was a Dutch politician of the People's Party for Freedom and Democracy (VVD) and economist.

Early life and education
Pais was of Jewish descent. Before World War II, he attended from 1942 on his secondary education at gymnasium level at the Jewish Lyceum in Amsterdam. Due to persecutions of the Jewish population during this war, he went into hiding with his family in Barneveld and thus survived the war. After the war, Pais continued his secondary education at the Vossius Gymnasium in Amsterdam between 1945 and 1948, and then studied at the University of Amsterdam where he received his doctorandus degree (equivalent to MSc) in social economics in 1954. After this study, Pais was appointed as a researcher at this university where he subsequently obtained his doctorate (PhD) in economic sciences in 1973.

Career
Pais worked as a financial analyst for the KPN from July 1958 until April 1974. Pais served on the Municipal Council of Amsterdam from September 1958 until December 1961 and served on the Provincial-Council of North Holland from June 1970 until July 1970. Pais worked as a professor of Public economics at the University of Amsterdam from April 1974 until 19 December 1977

Pais was elected as a Member of the Senate after the Senate election of 1977, taking office on 20 September 1977 serving as a frontbencher and spokesperson for Finances. After the election of 1977 Pais was appointed as Minister of Education and Sciences in the Cabinet Van Agt-Wiegel, taking office on 19 December 1977. In January 1981 Pais announced that he wouldn't stand for the election of 1981 but wanted to return to the Senate. After the Senate election of 1981 Pais returned as a Member of the Senate, taking office on 25 August 1981. The Cabinet Van Agt-Wiegel was replaced by the Cabinet Van Agt II following the cabinet formation of 1981 on 11 September 1981 and he continued to serve in the Senate serving a frontbencher chairing the parliamentary committee for Finances and spokesperson for Finances.

Personal life
He was married to Dutch politician and diplomat Eegje Schoo from 1970 until his death. Pais died in 2022 at the age of 92.

Honours

References

External links

Official
  Dr. A. (Arie) Pais Parlement & Politiek

1930 births
2022 deaths
Commanders of the Order of Orange-Nassau
Dutch academic administrators
Dutch autobiographers
Dutch bankers
Dutch corporate directors
Dutch education writers
Dutch expatriates in Luxembourg
Dutch memoirists
Dutch nonprofit directors
Dutch Sephardi Jews
Dutch people of Portuguese-Jewish descent
Dutch people of World War II
Jewish Dutch politicians
Jewish educators
Knights of the Order of the Netherlands Lion
Ministers of Education of the Netherlands
Members of the Senate (Netherlands)
Municipal councillors of Amsterdam
Politicians from The Hague
People's Party for Freedom and Democracy politicians
Dutch Reform Jews
University of Amsterdam alumni
Academic staff of the University of Amsterdam
20th-century Dutch economists
20th-century Dutch educators
20th-century Dutch male writers
20th-century Dutch politicians
20th-century Sephardi Jews
21st-century Dutch male writers
Sephardi Reform Jews